Morisqueta is a dish meal from Apatzingán Michoacan.
The dish consists of cooked rice, combined with beans, and served with a sauce of tomato, onion and garlic. It may contain cubes of  adobera, ranchero or fresh cheese, which melts. There are other sauces with pork or beef. It is accompanied with totopos, tostadas, or fried taquitos. In some places it is customary to serve morisqueta with aporreadillo (shredded, dried meat, fried with egg, cooked in a guajillo sauce with cumin). Morisqueta has a strong resemblance to Moros y Cristianos, since they use the same base of rice and beans.

Another rice dish, consisting of white rice, onion and garlic, but no beans, meat or cheese, is also called morisqueta. It is sometimes served with cilantro and Serrano pepper.

References 

Mexican rice dishes